A Walk Among the Tombstones may refer to:
A Walk Among the Tombstones (novel), a 1992 novel by Lawrence Block
A Walk Among the Tombstones (film), a 2014 film based on the novel, starring Liam Neeson